Nəmirli (also, Namirli and Namarly) is a village in the Yevlakh Rayon of Azerbaijan. The village forms part of the municipality of Qaramanlı.

References 

Populated places in Yevlakh District